Theodore Christian "Ted" Hines (September 9, 1926 - June 25, 1983) was a Washington, D.C.-born pioneer in the use of microcomputers and microcomputer programs in libraries.  He attended undergraduate school at George Washington University and received his Masters of Library Science (MLS) in 1958 and a PhD in 1960 both from Rutgers University.  He began his career as a children's librarian, and later became a professor of Library Science at Rutgers, followed by Columbia University, and the University of North Carolina at Greensboro.

With his wife, Lois Winkel, he designed an indexing program called the Children’s Media Databank. The program was first constructed on a mainframe computer, and then transferred to a microcomputer for patron use. This program allowed a patron to search for children's books by subject and reading level. A sample search query might be a 3rd grader with a 6th grade reading level on the subject of clouds.

Hines convened the first meeting of the American Society of Indexers (ASI, now American Society for Indexing) in 1968. 
The ASI considers him its "founding father", and set up the Theodore C. Hines Award in his honor in 1993.

Publications
 "The Crisis in Children's Cataloging" Library Journal  (September 15, 1966)
 "Computer Filing of Index, Bibliographic, and Catalog Entries" (BroDart, 1966) written with Jessica Harris
 "Terminology of Library and Information Science: A Selective Glossary" (Columbia University School of Library Service, 1971). 
 Translation of Louise-Noelle Malcles' "La Bibliographic" (1961)

References

1926 births
1983 deaths
American librarians
Columbia University faculty
George Washington University alumni
Founders of learned societies
People from Washington, D.C.
Rutgers University alumni
Rutgers University faculty
Place of death missing